The Healer is a 1935 American film directed by Reginald Barker. The film is also known as Little Pal.

Plot
Dr. Holden (Ralph Bellamy) is "The Healer" (the original title) in this 1930s morally uplifting pot-boiler. He is a doctor that has come home to a warm springs to try to heal children from the unnamed crippling disease (polio). He runs a destitute camp for these children, assisted by Evelyn Allen (Karen Morley) who looks upon the Doc as a great man. Jimmy (Mickey Rooney) is a paraplegic kid whom the Doc promises to cure. This little triangle is interrupted by a rich girl Joan Bradshaw (Judith Allen) who cons the good Doc into building a sanitorium for the wealthy with her father's money. Doc is momentarily swayed, but comes to his senses just as a forest fire threatens his original cabins around the warm spring. His treatment of Jimmy pays off as Jimmy rides a bicycle to save the day. Doc realizes that his true love is Evelyn, not the self-interested Joan.

Cast
Ralph Bellamy as Dr. Holden
Karen Morley as Evelyn Allen
Mickey Rooney as Jimmy
Judith Allen as Joan Bradshaw
Robert McWade as Mr. Bradshaw
Bruce Warren as Dr. Thornton
J. Farrell MacDonald as Applejack
Vessie Farrell as Martha

References

External links

1935 films
American black-and-white films
Films based on American novels
Monogram Pictures films
1935 drama films
American drama films
1930s English-language films
Films directed by Reginald Barker
1930s American films